The dutar (also dotar; ; ; ; ; ;) is a traditional Iranian long-necked two-stringed lute found in Iran and Central Asia. Its name comes from the Persian word for "two strings", دوتار do tār (< دو do "two",تار tār "string"), although the Herati dutar of Afghanistan has fourteen strings. Dutar is very popular in Tajikistan and Khorasan province of Iran. When played, the strings are usually plucked by the Uyghurs of Western China and strummed and plucked by the Tajiks, Turkmen, Uzbeks. Related instruments include the Kazakh dombra. The Dutar is also an important instrument among the Kurds of Khorasan amongst whom Haj Ghorban Soleimani of Quchan was a noted virtuoso. In Kurdish one who plays the dutar is known as a bakci (bakhshi), while in Azeri the term is ashiq. Khorasan bakhshi music is recognized on the Representative List of the Intangible Cultural Heritage of Humanity.

At the time of the Dutar's humble origins in the 15th century as a shepherd's instrument its strings were made from gut. However, with the opening up of the Silk Road, catgut gave way to strings made from twisted silk imported from China. To this day some instruments still feature silk strings, although nylon strings are also commonly used.

The dutar has a warm, dulcet tone. Typical sizes for the pear-shaped instrument range from one to two meters.

Typically it is tuned La Re or A D, but it also depends on the region.

UNESCO Intangible Cultural Heritage Lists 

Dutar making craftsmanship and traditional music performing art combined with singing from 2021 representative on the UNESCO Intangible Cultural Heritage Lists.

Notable players
Haj Ghorban Soleimani (1920–2008)
Turgun Alimatov (1922–2008)
Abdurahim Hamidov (1952–2013)
Abdurehim Heyit (Uyghur) (1962–)
Sanubar Tursun (1971–)
Alireza Soleimani (Aliabad, Khorasan)
Sultan Reza Bakci (Geliani) (Khorasani)
Haj Mohammad Hossein Yeganeh (Khorasani)
Abdolghader Afzali(Khorasan, Iran)
Aziz Tanha (Korasan, Iran)
Saied Tehranizadeh
Abd Allah Amini (Khorasani)
Zolfaghar Askarian (Khorasani)
Gholam Ali Poor Ataa (Khorasani)
Aliia Gholi Yeganeh (Turkmen)
Osman Mohammadparast (Khaf, Iran)
Abdollah Alijani Ardeshir (Tehran, Iran)

See also

Shashmaqam
Turgun Alimatov
Dotara
Bağlama
Çiftelia
Music of Iran
Music of Afghanistan
Music of Tajikistan
Music of Turkmenistan
Music of Central Asia

References

External links

Listen famous Dutar tunes
Encyclopedia of Persian Music Instruments
Dutar Music of Turkmenistan (ethnomusicology essay by Graham Flett, 2001)

Necked bowl lutes
Central Asian music
Uyghur musical instruments
Kazakhstani musical instruments
Uzbekistani musical instruments
Kyrgyz musical instruments
Afghan musical instruments
Tajik musical instruments
Turkmen musical instruments
Persian words and phrases
Iranian inventions
Persian musical instruments